The 1992 Giro di Lombardia was the 86th edition of the Giro di Lombardia cycle race and was held on 17 October 1992. The race started and finished in Monza. The race was won by Tony Rominger of the CLAS–Cajastur team.

General classification

References

1992
1992 in road cycling
1992 in Italian sport
1992 UCI Road World Cup
October 1992 sports events in Europe